Tomislav Gondžić (born 30 April 1980 in Croatia) is a Croatian retired footballer.

Club career
Gondžić had a spell in the Austrian third and fourth tier, with SC Weiz.

References

1980 births
Living people
Footballers from Zagreb
Association football forwards
Association football midfielders
Croatian footballers
NK Inter Zaprešić players
NK Croatia Sesvete players
GNK Dinamo Zagreb players
NK Zadar players
Croatian Football League players
Austrian Landesliga players
Austrian Regionalliga players
Croatian expatriate footballers
Expatriate footballers in Austria
Croatian expatriate sportspeople in Austria